Metildigoxin (INN, or medigoxin BAN, or methyldigoxin) is a cardiac glycoside, a type of drug that can be used in the treatment of congestive heart failure and cardiac arrhythmia (irregular heartbeat). The substance is closely related to digoxin; it differs from the latter only by an O-methyl group on the terminal monosaccharide.

References 

Antiarrhythmic agents
Cardenolides